Westshore may refer to:

Westshore, New Zealand, a coastal suburb of the city of Napier, Hawke's Bay
Westshore (Tampa), a business district in Tampa, Florida, United States
WestShore Plaza, a shopping center
South Westshore, a neighborhood

See also
West Shore (disambiguation)West Shore